The French destroyer La Railleuse was one of 14 s built for the French Navy during the 1920s. During World War II, she was destroyed when one of her torpedoes exploded on 23 March 1940.

Design and description
The L'Adroit class was a slightly enlarged and improved version of the preceding Bourrasque class. They were powered by two geared steam turbines, each driving one propeller shaft, using steam provided by three du Temple boilers.

The main armament of the L'Adroit-class ships consisted of four Canon de 130 mm Modèle 1924 guns in single mounts, one superfiring pair fore and aft of the superstructure. Their anti-aircraft armament consisted of a pair of Canon de 37 mm Modèle 1925 guns. The ships carried two above-water triple sets of  torpedo tubes. A pair of depth charge chutes were built into their stern; these housed a total of sixteen  depth charges. In addition two depth charge throwers were fitted for which six  depth charges were carried.

Construction and career

La Railleuse was laid down on 1 August 1925, launched on 9 September 1926 and completed on 15 March 1928. She was cut in half by an accidental explosion of one of her torpedoes on 23 March 1940 at Casablanca, French Morocco, killing 28 and wounding 24 crewmen. Her main guns were removed from the wreck and installed as coast-defense guns at Safi, French Morocco. Her remains were sold for scrap in April 1942.

Notes

Citations

References

 
 

L'Adroit-class destroyers
World War II destroyers of France
1926 ships
Maritime incidents in March 1940
World War II shipwrecks in the Atlantic Ocean
Ships built by Chantiers Dubigeon
Ships sunk by non-combat internal explosions